Gohreh Rural District is a rural district (dehestan) in the Fin District of Bandar Abbas County, Hormozgan Province, Iran. At the 2011 census, its population was 1,881, in 551 families.  The rural district has 23 villages.

References 

Rural Districts of Hormozgan Province
Bandar Abbas County